Duke Ai of Qin (died 501 BC) was from 536 to 501 BC the nineteenth ruler of the Zhou Dynasty state of Qin that eventually united China to become the Qin Dynasty.  His ancestral name was Ying (嬴), and Duke Ai was his posthumous title.  Duke Ai succeeded his father Duke Jing of Qin, who died in 537 BC, as ruler of Qin.

Marriage with Chu
In 523 BC, Duke Ai betrothed his daughter Bo Ying to Crown Prince Jian of the State of Chu, Qin's ally.  Prince Jian's father, King Ping of Chu, sent the minister Fei Wuji to escort the princess to Chu.  However, Fei Wuji saw that the princess was beautiful and persuaded King Ping to take her as his own wife.  Prince Jian fled abroad and was later killed.  Bo Ying later bore King Ping a son, who in 515 BC ascended the Chu throne, to be known as King Zhao of Chu.

Fighting Wu to help Chu
In 506 BC, King Helü of the State of Wu invaded Chu, decisively defeated the Chu army at the Battle of Boju, and captured the Chu capital Ying.  King Zhao of Chu escaped to the State of Sui.  Chu minister Shen Baoxu went to Qin to plead for assistance.  It is said that Duke Ai originally rejected the request, but finally agreed to help after Shen Baoxu wailed for seven days outside the Qin palace without eating.

Duke Ai sent generals Zipu (子蒲) and Zihu (子虎) with 500 chariots to Chu.  In 505 BC the joint Qin-Chu forces defeated Wu in a series of battles, and King Helü was forced to retreat to Wu, and King Zhao returned to Chu.

Death and succession
In 501 BC Duke Ai died after 36 years of reign.  His son predeceased him and was given the posthumous title Duke Yi (秦夷公).  Duke Ai was succeeded by Duke Yi's son, his grandson Duke Hui I of Qin.

References

Year of birth unknown
Rulers of Qin
6th-century BC Chinese monarchs
501 BC deaths